Đurišić (also transliterated Djurišić) is a surname. Notable people with the surname include:

 Duško Đurišić (born 1977), Montenegrin football player
 Milan Đurišić (born 1987), Montenegrin football player
 Nikola Đurišić (born 2004), Serbian basketball player, son of Duško Đurišić
 Pavle Đurišić (1909–1945), Montenegrin Serb Chetnik commander

Montenegrin surnames
Serbian surnames
Slavic-language surnames